Alhos Vedros is a town and a parish in the municipality of Moita, in Portugal. The population in 2011 was 15,050, in an area of 17.91 km2.

References

Freguesias of Moita